The Oulu Market Hall is a historic market hall in the Market Square, in the centre of Oulu, Finland. The market hall was opened in 1901.

The city council of Oulu decided to build the market hall in 1889 due to the tightened food safety regulations in Finland. Specifically butchers were to be moved from the open market square to the covered market. The warehouses surrounding the Hall are former granaries converted into handicraft shops. The construction of a hotel, the Oulu Market Hotel, situated next to the Hall, has been approved in 2015.

The market hall was designed by architects Karl Lindahl and Walter Thomé. It was completed in 1901. Along with two aisles there were 62 wooden shop stalls.

See also
 Kuopio Market Hall
 Tampere Market Hall
 Turku Market Hall
 Vaasa Market Hall

References

External links 

Buildings and structures in Oulu
Commercial buildings completed in 1901
Gothic Revival architecture in Finland
Market halls
Pokkinen
Tourist attractions in Oulu
Art Nouveau architecture in Finland
Art Nouveau retail buildings